Kibar Tatar (born 15 November 1968) is a Turkish boxer. He competed in the men's lightweight event at the 1988 Summer Olympics.

References

External links
 

1968 births
Living people
Turkish male boxers
Olympic boxers of Turkey
Boxers at the 1988 Summer Olympics
Place of birth missing (living people)
Lightweight boxers